The Andorra national ice hockey team is the national men's ice hockey team of Andorra. The team is controlled by the Federació Andorrana d'Esports de Gel (FAEG) and has been an associate member of the International Ice Hockey Federation (IIHF).

History
Ice hockey in Andorra as a sport began in 1987, with the opening of the Palau de Gel, the principality's only ice rink, in the town of Canillo. The Andorran Federation of Ice Sports, known in Catalan as the Federació Andorrana d'Esports de Gel (FAEG), was established in 1992 and later joined the IIHF on 4 May 1995. Despite not having a national team nor entering in any IIHF tournaments, Andorra was the host nation of the 1997 IIHF World Championship Group D tournament in Canillo.

However, it was only in 2017, when an official Andorra national team was organized. The national team made its debut at the 2017 IIHF Development Cup which was hosted in Canillo. Andorra played Portugal, Ireland, and Morocco. They lost all of their matches in the tournament, including a 5–3 defeat to Portugal in the bronze medal match. Andorra's first match was on 29 September 2017 against Portugal, the match ended in a 3–2 defeat in penalty shootout.

Tournament record

World Championship

IIHF Development Cup

All-time record against other national teams

References

2017 establishments in Andorra
National
National ice hockey teams in Europe
Ice hockey